Johannes (Jan) van Swieten (Mainz, 28 May 1807 – The Hague, 9 September 1888) was a Dutch General and politician.

History
Van Swieten started his career in 1821 as an volunteer and started as a cadet in 1822, in 1824 became a second Lieutenant.
Jan van Swieten played an important role as an officer in the Dutch East Indies and led expeditions in Java. Returned to the Netherlands in 1862, and was politically active for some time. In 1873 he was appointed commander of an expedition to Java and Sumatra after a botched local invasion of Aceh in March. He recaptured The Kraton.  In 1874 he received the Grand Cross of the Military Order of William.

He served as commander of the Royal Netherlands East Indies Army from 1858-1862.

Career
Second Lieutenant in Dutch East Indies Army, from 1827 to 1830 (participated in the Java War)
First Lieutenant  under Prince Frederik, Duke of Saxe-Weimar, 1830
First Lieutenant in the field, from 1830 to 1834 in the Army
Captain Dutch East Indies Army, battalion Rifles Guards “Van Cleerens” (in Java), from 1835 to 1842
Captain Dutch East Indies Army (Sumatra), from 1842 to 1845
Convoy commander south of Dataran Tinggi Padang Dutch, East Indies Army, from 1845 to 1846
Officer  Dutch East Indies  Army  in Java, from 1846 to 1848
Chief of Staff Bali second expedition, from 1848 to 1849
Battalion commander Bali third expedition, 1849
Civil and military governor Sumatra's west coast, from 1849 to 1858
Commander Royal Netherlands East Indies Army, from 1858 to 1862
Retired, from 1862 to 1873
Member Council of State in extraordinary service, from February 16, 1864 to September 9, 1888
Member of the House of Representatives, of September 19, 1864 to October 1, 1866 (for the constituency Amsterdam)
Government commissioner and commander to the Dutch East Indies, from 1873 to 1874 (Second Aceh Expedition)
Retired as a soldier, 1874

Officers ranks
Second lieutenant of infantry, from 1826 to 1829
First lieutenant of infantry from 1829 to 1835
Captain of infantry, from 1835 to 1841
Major of infantry, from 1841 to 1844
Lieutenant-colonel of infantry, from 1844 to 1849
Colonel of infantry, from 1849 to 1853
Major General of Infantry, from 1853 to 1858
Lieutenant-General of Infantry, from 1858 to September 9, 1888 (from 1862 on non-active)

References

 http://www.biografischportaal.nl/persoon/15813411
 http://www.parlementairdocumentatiecentrum.nl/id/vg09ll9w52tp

1807 births
1888 deaths
Royal Netherlands East Indies Army generals
Royal Netherlands East Indies Army officers
Knights Grand Cross of the Military Order of William
Knights Commander of the Military Order of William
Knights Third Class of the Military Order of William